"Officers' Call" is a bugle call which signals all officers to assemble at a designated place.

References
bands.army.mil

Bugle calls